This is a list of large optical telescopes. For telescopes larger than 3 meters in aperture see List of largest optical reflecting telescopes. This list combines large or expensive reflecting telescopes from any era, as what constitutes famous reflector has changed over time. In 1900 a 1-meter reflector would be among the largest in the world, but by 2000, would be relatively common for professional observatories.

Large reflectors and catadioptric

See List of largest optical reflecting telescopes for continuation of list to larger scopes

Selected telescopes below about 2 meters aperture
A non-comprehensive non-exclusionary list of telescopes one yard to less than 2 metres in aperture.

Selected telescopes below about 1 meter/yard aperture

See also
 Lists of telescopes

References

Optical telescopes